Woodworth is a town in Rapides Parish, Louisiana, United States. It is part of the Alexandria, Louisiana Metropolitan Statistical Area. The population was 1,096 at the 2010 census.

This town is growing rapidly with a number of residential subdivisions under development. Woodworth is emerging as a bedroom community for nearby Alexandria, to the northeast. Louisiana State Senator Joe McPherson resides in Woodworth, as did the late State Representative R. W. "Buzzy" Graham, who operated an insurance agency in Alexandria.

According to a 2007 report, Woodworth was named one of the 10 worst speed traps in the state of Louisiana. Woodworth made 61.32% of its revenue, an average of roughly $706 per capita, from fines and forfeitures in the 2005 fiscal year.

History
Woodworth was established in 1942 under the Lawrason Act.

https://www.lma.org/LMA/About_LMA/Organization_Profile.aspx?id=1297

The town began with a small population here and there in the 1880’s with the first significant civilian being George Hendricks from Arkansas who allegedly built a rice farm here, but later he found himself unsuccessful and left.

But the town did not stop yet as a man named John McEnery came from New Orleans, LA and brought his railroad company (New Orleans Pacific Railroad) with him. McEnery did not have this land for long however as he later sold it and, on November 25, 1890, the 18,000 acres of land was sold to three people: C. E. Roberts, C. S. Woodworth, and Ed Rand all of whom were from neighboring Texas. The three men had yet to explore this land but yet they made the Rapides Lumber Company and a sawmill was constructed on its site. The name of this town originates from C. S. Woodworth’s name of whom the company decided the community should be named after.

Soon after the sawmill was constructed, a Missouri located company bought out positions of the lumber company being those held by C. S. Woodworth and C. E. Roberts, but Rand kept his position. Because of these transfers, the company was renamed to the Long-Bell Lumber Company of Woodworth. By the early 1900’s, the town of Woodworth had reached a population of 1,000 and many stores and churches were built, and all of this depended on the sawmill.

When the war era approached, the town still maintained good business and other job opportunities arose alongside the sawmill such as a doctor, lawyer, teacher, and store clerk. A new school was even built in 1927 but was later closed in 1963 and later became a polling station for elections. However, these opportunities did not last long as 35 years after the community began, the sawmill eventually closed down and with it, so did the local economy. In 1931, a road was completed connecting Woodworth to Alexandria, LA.

In 1942, the town was incorporated and a Civilian Conservation Camp was constructed in the nearby Alexander State Forest and so was Camp Claiborne. Camp Claiborne was one of the most important military training camps in the nation at the time and therefore it brought many new residents back into the community and beginning a new era for the town of Woodworth.

https://townofwoodworth.com/sites/default/files/THE%20VILLAGE%20OF%20WOODWORTH.pdf

Geography
Woodworth is located at  (31.156270, -92.494650).

Major highways
  U.S. Route 165
  LA 3265
  Interstate 49

Climate
This climatic region is typified by relatively small seasonal temperature differences, with warm to hot (and often humid) summers and mild winters. According to the Köppen Climate Classification system, Woodworth has a humid subtropical climate, abbreviated "Cfa" on climate maps.

Demographics

2020 census

As of the 2020 United States census, there were 1,762 people, 628 households, and 435 families residing in the town.

2000 census
As of the census of 2000, there were 1,080 people, 385 households, and 299 families residing in the town. The racial makeup of the town was 87.96% White, 10.46% African American, 0.46% Native American, 0.28% from other races, and 0.83% from two or more races. Hispanic or Latino of any race were 2.13% of the population.

There were 385 households, out of which 45.7% had children under the age of 18 living with them, 63.1% were married couples living together, 11.7% had a female householder with no husband present, and 22.1% were non-families. 18.2% of all households were made up of individuals, and 4.2% had someone living alone who was 65 years of age or older. The average household size was 2.81 and the average family size was 3.22.

In the town, the population was spread out, with 29.8% under the age of 18, 10.7% from 18 to 24, 32.1% from 25 to 44, 19.6% from 45 to 64, and 7.7% who were 65 years of age or older. The median age was 33 years. For every 100 females, there were 101.5 males. For every 100 females age 18 and over, there were 94.4 males.

The median income for a household in the town was $37,262, and the median income for a family was $41,667. Males had a median income of $30,417 versus $23,587 for females. The per capita income for the town was $16,200. About 6.8% of families and 9.8% of the population were below the poverty line, including 9.7% of those under age 18 and 9.4% of those age 65 or over.

Education

Caroline Dormon Junior High

In August 2012, Caroline Dormon Junior High School was completed and ready for the new school year. Sitting on a 33-acre site off U.S. Route 165, the $6.5 million project is the first "green" school for the CenLa area as well as the first school within Woodworth city limits. The 50,000 sq ft building currently holds about 300 students . The school hold classes from kindergarten to 8th grade.

Court 
Woodworth is among 250 towns and villages in Louisiana with a Mayors court as provided by R.S. 33:44l and 442.

History
A mayors court was authorized through Municipal charters, and an act of 1772, giving a mayor the jurisdiction of a justice of the peace as to petty causes. Louisiana and Ohio have this form of court system.

Controversy
There has been controversy on the town being considered as a speed trap and the fact that the mayor has a conflict of interest also filling the Judiciary position. A suit was filed in one case ultimately resulting in the plaintiff being vindicated by a Louisiana appeals court.

References

External links
Town of Woodworth

Towns in Rapides Parish, Louisiana
Towns in Louisiana
Alexandria metropolitan area, Louisiana